The 1978 European Weightlifting Championships were held in Havířov, Czechoslovakia from June 10 to June 18, 1978. This was the 57th edition of the event. There were 128 men in action from 25 nations.

Medal summary

Medal table
Ranking by Big (Total result) medals

References
Results (Chidlovski.net)
М. Л. Аптекарь. «Тяжёлая атлетика. Справочник.» — М.: «Физкультура и спорт», 1983. — 416 с. 

European Weightlifting Championships
European Weightlifting Championships
European Weightlifting Championships
European Weightlifting Championships
International sports competitions hosted by Czechoslovakia
Sport in Havířov